In sport, a whitewash or sweep  is a series in which a person or team wins every game, or when a player or team wins a match to-nil.

Usage by sport

Baseball
In Major League Baseball, teams typically play multiple games against each other; if one team wins all the games in that series, it is considered a "series sweep", or, more commonly, simply a "sweep". In many cases, fans of the team in the favoured position, when all but one contest in the current series have been won, will bring brooms (either real brooms or large props for better visibility) to the ballpark with which to taunt the losing team.

On rare occasions, a "season sweep" can be accomplished, in which every contest between two teams is won by the same team. Intra-division season sweeps are relatively rare, since with the relatively large number of games against intra-division teams (19 per divisional matchup), the division rivals are more likely to find at least one lucky matchup. In cases where two teams only play each other once in the season, there is no distinction made between a series and season sweep.

Basketball
The NBA Playoffs comprises four rounds of best-of-seven series; any team that wins the first four games of a playoff series would have accomplished a series sweep. However, in early playoff seasons, there were two game sweeps in a best-of three series. And in later years, there were three game sweeps in a best-of-five series. The first sweep in NBA playoffs history was in 1948 by the Baltimore Bullets.

Since the establishment of the National Basketball Association, there have been 182 playoff series sweeps. Nine of which occurred in the NBA Finals. The most recent NBA Playoff sweep was recorded by the Boston Celtics, in 2022, against the Brooklyn Nets. The Los Angeles Lakers hold the most series sweeps in NBA Playoff history, with 31.

Cricket
In cricket, a whitewash is when a team wins all the matches played in a series of at least 3 matches.

Ice hockey
The Stanley Cup Playoffs comprises four rounds of best-of-seven series; any team that wins the first four games of a playoff series would have accomplished a series sweep. As of 2021, there has not been an instance where a team has achieved a 4–0 series sweep in the Stanley Cup Finals since 1998; as a result, the NHL has gone 22 seasons (or 23 years) without a sweep in the finals, making it the longest active drought in the history of the major professional sports leagues in the United States and Canada.

Rugby
The term whitewash is also used in rugby when one team loses every match in a particular series. The team that comes last in the Six Nations Championship (where a sweep over the others is referred to as the Grand Slam) has the ignominy of being awarded the wooden spoon, even if they have not suffered a complete whitewash.

Snooker
Whitewash is a term used in snooker when a player wins a match without losing a single frame. Only three whitewashes have been recorded in the final of snooker ranking tournaments; in the 1989 Grand Prix, the 2020 European Masters, and the 2022 German Masters. There was also a whitewash in the 1988 Masters final, when Steve Davis beat Mike Hallett 9–0.

Tennis
In ATP and WTA tennis, the term whitewash is used when a player fails to win a game in a match (6–0, 6–0, 6–0; or 6–0, 6–0), also called a triple- or double-bagel respectively. Double bagels are more common.

See also
 Podium sweep
 Shutout

References

Sports terminology
Terminology used in multiple sports
Perfect scores in sports